The Horncastle by-election was a UK parliamentary by-election held on 16 February 1911 in the constituency of Horncastle in Lincolnshire. It was triggered upon the succession to the peerage of the sitting Member of Parliament, Gilbert Heathcote-Drummond-Willoughby, and was won by Archibald Weigall of the Conservative Party.

Vacancy
Lord Willoughby, who had held the seat since 1895, succeeded to the peerage on the death of his father, Lord Ancaster. The by-election was called for 16 February 1911.

Result last time

Candidates
The new Conservative candidate Captain Archibald Weigall, had fought the nearby seat of Gainsborough at the December 1910 general election. 
Frederick Linfield was formally re-adopted as Liberal candidate on 5 January 1911.

Result
Given the Unionist hold on the seat in recent times and an analysis of the past results and new voters on the roll enabled the correspondent of The Times newspaper to forecast correctly that the Unionists would hold the seat. However, there was a swing to the Liberals that nearly resulted in a gain.

Aftermath
Weigall was re-elected in 1918 before taking up an appointment as Governor of South Australia.
Linfield did not contest the 1918 elections but was successful in 1922 at Mid Bedfordshire.

References 
Craig, F. W. S. (1983). British parliamentary election results 1918-1949 (3 ed.). Chichester: Parliamentary Research Services. .

1911 in England
1911 elections in the United Kingdom
By-elections to the Parliament of the United Kingdom in Lincolnshire constituencies
Horncastle